Franz Pfanne (born 10 December 1994) is a German footballer who plays as a midfielder for Borussia Dortmund II.

Career
Pfanne made his professional debut for Dynamo Dresden in the 3. Liga on 24 September 2014, coming on as a substitute in the 89th minute for Sinan Tekerci in the 1–1 away draw against Hallescher FC.

References

External links
 Profile at DFB.de
 Profile at kicker.de
 Budissa Bautzen II statistics

1994 births
Living people
People from Bautzen
Footballers from Saxony
German footballers
Association football midfielders
Dynamo Dresden II players
Dynamo Dresden players
FSV Budissa Bautzen players
SV Rödinghausen players
Borussia Dortmund II players
3. Liga players
Regionalliga players